Wish Man is a 2019 American biographical drama film written and directed by Theo Davies and starring Andrew Steel, Kirby Bliss Blanton, Tom Sizemore, Frank Whaley, Bruce Davison, Robert Pine, Fay Masterson, Dale Dickey and Danny Trejo. El Ride productions helped bring the film to fruition with late funding which made the final edit possible.

Premise
Frank Shankwitz, an Arizona motorcycle cop with a troubled past, survives a near-fatal accident during a high-speed pursuit. As part of Frank's rehabilitation, police chief Sgt. Eddie Newman asks him to spend time with a terminally ill little boy, Michael, whose dying wish is to be a Highway Patrol motorcycle officer. To Michael, Frank is a hero and an unlikely friendship is born. The boy inspires Frank to follow a new path, which leads to the creation of the Make-A-Wish Foundation.  Movie epilogue states that over 450,000 wishes have been granted since the beginning of the charity.

Cast
 Andrew Steel as Frank Shankwitz
 Kirby Bliss Blanton as Kitty Carlisle
 Tom Sizemore as Sergeant Mason
 Fay Masterson as Lorraine
 Robert Pine as Sergeant Eddie Newman
 Bruce Davison as Frank Shankwitz Sr.
 Frank Whaley as Officer Tom Wells
 Dale Dickey as "Clover"
 Steven Michael Quezada as Juan Delgadillo
 Jason Gerhardt as Young Frank Shankwitz Sr.
 Danny Trejo as Jose
 Julian Curtis as Officer Mitch Myers
 Christian Ganiere as Michael Allen
 Kym Jackson as Sally
 Chris Day as Young Frank Shankwitz
 Larry Wilcox as John Foster

References

External links

2019 films
2019 biographical drama films
American biographical drama films
2019 drama films
2010s English-language films
2010s American films